Curt Sampson (born January 29, 1952) is an American non-fiction writer and freelance journalist. He is best known for his 1996 biography and New York Times bestseller Hogan published in 1996, the story of one of the most complex and notable athletes of the 20th century and his New York Times bestseller The Masters: Golf, Money, and Power in Augusta, Georgia published in 1998.

Sampson co-authored George Karl's memoir, Furious George, in 2017. It was Sampson's second book about basketball.

Books
Sampson has written more than 14 books in his twenty-two year career as a writer.  
 1992 The Eternal Summer 
 1993 Texas Golf Legends 
 1995 Full Court Pressure 
 1996 Hogan 
 1998 The Masters 
 2000 Royal And Ancient 
 2002 Chasing Tiger 
 2005 The Slam 
 2005 The Lost Masters 
 2007 A Vision – Not a Blueprint 
 2006 Centennial 
 2008 Golf Dads 
 2011 A Dallas Classic 
 2012 The War by the Shore 
 2017 Furious George 
 2019 Roaring Back: The Fall and Rise of Tiger Woods

References

1948 births
American freelance journalists
Living people